The following is an incomplete list of starting quarterbacks for the Winnipeg Blue Bombers of the Canadian Football League that have started a regular season game for the team. This list includes postseason appearances since 1992, but does not include preseason games. They are listed in order of most starts with any tiebreaker being the date of each player's first start at quarterback for the Blue Bombers.

Season-by-season

Where known, the number of games they started during the season is listed to the right:

 * - Indicates that the number of starts is not known for that year for each quarterback

References
 CFL Record Book 2017
 Stats Crew Winnipeg Blue Bombers
 CFLapedia
 CFLDB

Starting quarterbacks
Winnipeg Blue Bombers
Starting quarterbacks